Thomas Forsyth Torrance  (30 August 1913 – 2 December 2007), commonly referred to as T. F. Torrance, was a Scottish Protestant theologian and minister. Torrance served for 27 years as professor of Christian dogmatics at New College, in the University of Edinburgh. He is best known for his pioneering work in the study of science and theology, but he is equally respected for his work in systematic theology. While he wrote many books and articles advancing his own study of theology, he also edited the translation of several hundred theological writings into English from other languages, including the English translation of the thirteen-volume, six-million-word Church Dogmatics of Swiss theologian Karl Barth, as well as John Calvin's New Testament Commentaries. He was a member of the famed Torrance family of theologians.

Torrance has been acknowledged as one of the most significant English-speaking theologians of the 20th century. In 1978, he received the Templeton Foundation Prize for Progress in Religion. Torrance remained a dedicated churchman throughout his life, serving as an ordained minister in the Church of Scotland. He was instrumental in the development of the historic agreement between the Reformed and Eastern Orthodox churches on the doctrine of the Trinity when a joint statement of agreement on that doctrine was issued between the World Alliance of Reformed Churches and the Orthodox Church on 13 March 1991. He retired from the University of Edinburgh in 1979, but continued to lecture and to publish extensively. Several influential books on the Trinity were published after his retirement; The Trinitarian Faith: The Evangelical Theology of the Ancient Catholic Church (1988), Trinitarian Perspectives: Toward Doctrinal Agreement (1994) and The Christian Doctrine of God, One Being Three Persons (1996).

Early years

Torrance was the son of the Revd Thomas Torrance (1871–1959) and Annie Elizabeth Torrance (1883–1981), both Scottish missionaries of China Inland Mission in Chengdu, Sichuan, West China; named after his great-grandfather, Thomas Forsyth Torrance; and spent the first 13 years of his life there. He was educated at the universities of Edinburgh, Oxford and Basel. He began studying in Edinburgh in 1931, focussing on classics and philosophy.  At that time his own realist views of philosophy, theology and morality started to take shape, and as he moved to the study of theology at the Faculty of Divinity (New College) in 1934 this led him to question the theological methodology of Schleiermacher for its lack of any realist scientific objectivity. For Torrance, such objectivity meant that theology needed to allow all its concepts to be shaped by the unique nature of the object of reflection. In this regard, theology did not differ from science; what set science and theology apart of course was the different nature of the objects of their reflection. In the case of science that was the world created by God; in the case of theology it was God the creator, reconciler and redeemer who was no distant God but the God who became incarnate in his Son within time and space in order to reconcile the world to himself. This insight led Torrance to oppose every form of dualism because such thinking always tended to keep God from interacting with us in history in one way or another. He also opposed all forms of "subjectivism" because he held that it was impossible for people to know God objectively by reflecting upon themselves. Torrance was strongly influenced by Hugh Ross Mackintosh (1870-1936) and by Daniel Lamont (1869-1950), the former stressing the centrality of Christ and the connection between theology and mission, and the latter stressing the relationship between Christianity and scientific culture.

Student years and early years as professor

Torrance was awarded the Blackie Fellowship in 1936 for study in the Middle East. This was not without its precarious moments, as when he was sentenced to death in Basra (Iraq), accused of being a spy. He was able to convince the authorities that he was a theological student and was allowed to proceed to Baghdad and then to Syria. He eventually returned to Scotland, specialized in systematic theology and graduated summa cum laude. After this he studied with Karl Barth in Basel. In 1946 he became engaged to Margaret Edith Spear and completed his doctorate magna cum laude. From 1938 to 1939 Torrance taught at Auburn Theological Seminary in upstate New York and was eventually offered a position in religion at Princeton University which he did not accept because he decided to return home to Scotland with war in Europe on the horizon. From 1939 to 1940 Torrance studied at Oriel College, Oxford. He was ordained as a minister on 20 March 1940. During World War II he provided pastoral and practical support to Scottish soldiers in North Africa and northern Italy and escaped with his life after coming under fire on more than one occasion. After the war, Torrance returned to his parish in Alyth and later became minister at Beechgrove Church in Aberdeen, following in the footsteps of his former beloved professor, Hugh Ross Mackintosh. He married Margaret Edith Spear on 2 October 1946 at Combe Down Parish Church, near Bath, England. The Torrance family soon included Thomas Spear Torrance, who was born on 3 July 1947 and is now an economist and philosopher of science at Heriot-Watt University in Edinburgh; Iain Richard Torrance who was born on 13 January 1949 and the former President of Princeton Theological Seminary in New Jersey and Professor of Patristics; and Alison Meta Elizabeth Torrance who was born on 15 April 1951 and is a medical doctor in general practice in Edinburgh.

Torrance received an honorary doctorate from Heriot-Watt University in 1983.

Churchman

As an ordained minister in the Church of Scotland he served as Moderator of the General Assembly of the Church of Scotland from 1976 to 1977, as did his son Iain from 2003 to 2004. As a Reformed churchman and theologian, Torrance worked toward ecumenical harmony with Anglicans, Lutherans, Eastern Orthodox and Roman Catholics throughout his career. In recognition of his ecumenical work with the Eastern Orthodox Church, he was made an honorary protopresbyter in the Patriarchate of Alexandria by the Archbishop of Axum in 1973. Torrance himself served on the Reformed–Roman Catholic Study Commission on the Eucharist which met at Woudschoten, in the Netherlands in 1974, during which time he formed a personal relationship with the Roman Catholic cardinal and renowned ecumenist Yves Congar. He represented the Church of Scotland in conversations with the Church of England between 1949 – 1951 and fought tirelessly for the visible union of the Church, and not merely a spiritual union; he was the Convener of the Church of Scotland Commission on Baptism from 1954 to 1962 (with John Heron, the father of Alasdair Heron, acting as secretary to the commission); and was present at the World Council of Churches meeting in Evanston, Illinois, in 1954.
 
Torrance led a colloquy in Switzerland in March 1975 which discussed Karl Rahner's work on the Trinity because he believed that Rahner's work offered an opportunity for genuine ecumenical convergence between East and West, Catholic and Evangelical Christians. Torrance made significant contributions to Reformed and Roman Catholic discussions of Justification by Faith and by Grace as well. There is much in Torrance's writing that could form the basis for significant fraternal dialogue between Christians and Jews. Torrance studied with the Swiss Reformed theologian Karl Barth in Basel, completing his dissertation on "The Doctrine of Grace in the Apostolic Fathers" in 1946, after his service as a chaplain during World War II. In 1948, he was the founding editor of the peer-reviewed journal the Scottish Journal of Theology, which his son Iain continues to edit along with Bryan Spinks of Yale University.

Dogmatic theology
One of the reasons that Torrance's theology is now becoming the focus for many doctoral students is that his was a profoundly Christ-centered theology that was in no way Christomonist (one that reduced all theology to Christology), but instead integrated all Christian doctrine in such a way as to offer sensible and compelling explanations of the Christian faith. This integration of doctrine began for Torrance with the Nicene homoousion (the idea that the eternal Son was and is one in being with the Father and Spirit in eternity and with us by virtue of the incarnation), and included the doctrines of the Trinity, Creation, Incarnation, Atonement, Eschatology, Pneumatology, the church and the sacraments as well as a theology of ordained ministry. Interpreting each of these doctrines from within the perspective of an ecumenically open doctrine of the Trinity, with which most Roman Catholic and Orthodox theologians would substantially agree, Torrance forged an understanding of Justification by Grace that demonstrated exactly how and why Christ, in his uniqueness as God become man acting from within the human situation marked by sin and evil, overcame sin, suffering, evil and death once and for all both from the divine and the human side.  This enabled Torrance to offer a theology that was at once full of depth and meaning and yet joyful and hopeful because he knew that Jesus was no mere moral example of the good life, but God himself who suffered the God-forsakenness associated with human enmity against God on the cross out of unconditional love for humanity, and did so effectively precisely because he was the Word of God incarnate.  He once said that if Jesus was just a man dying on a cross, then Christianity would be immoral, offering a picture of a vindictive God along with the image of a pagan human attempt to appease God through human sacrifice—a form of self-justification.  But put God on the cross and the whole picture changes because then the depth of God's costly love could be seen to include the fact that God was not aloof from human suffering but willing himself to experience this suffering in his own Son in order to overcome all that threatens true human existence in fellowship with God.  All of this was accomplished and demonstrated in Christ's resurrection and continues to be lived as part of the new creation in the Church, as the community is united through faith and hope with the ascended and advent Lord by the Holy Spirit, through partaking of the Sacraments and through preaching and teaching the Gospel.

Theology and science
As indicated by the fact that he was awarded the Templeton Foundation Prize for Progress in Religion in 1978, Torrance made singular contributions to the dialogue between science and theology.  His contributions in this area led Alister McGrath to observe that many of those theologians he studied did not seem bothered by the fact that they had no first-hand knowledge of the method and norms of natural science, but wrote about science nonetheless!  But it was different with Torrance. "Torrance’s writings were, quite simply, of landmark significance." P. Mark Achtemeier describes Torrance's work in this area as "magisterial and highly original." Christopher Kaiser noted that if Einstein was the person of the century from the perspective of the secular media, then Torrance would qualify as the theologian of the century from the perspective of people who are science minded. In his groundbreaking book Theological Science, Torrance argued that theological and natural science held in common the same need to understand reality through our thoughts by pointing beyond ourselves and not letting our subjective experiences and knowledge distort the objective reality we are attempting to conceptualize.  Theology and science should be seen as "allies in a common front where each faces the same insidious enemy, namely, man himself assuming the role of Creator . . ." (Torrance, Theological Science, xiii).  As long as the dialogue is conceived to be between science and religion, Torrance contended, "we shall not escape from romantic naturalism."  Instead, he insisted that we must focus on the dialogue between science and theology and thus between the "philosophy of natural science" and the "philosophy of theological science" because these two methods have in common the "struggle for scientific method on their proper ground and their own distinctive fields" (Torrance, Theological Science, xiii).  Torrance did a great deal to foster this discussion in his books Space, Time and Incarnation and Space, Time and Resurrection where he showed the connections between the two sciences by allowing theology to understand what it means to think of God acting in new and distinctive ways within created time and space, while respecting the distinctive nature of creation itself in its fallen and reconciled condition.  Torrance famously argued for a non-dualist and non-monist view of theology and science in the school of the renowned physicist and theologian John Philoponos (490-570) whose thinking stood in stark contrast to Aristotelian and Neoplatonic thinking which Torrance believed was harmful both to science and to theology.  Such thinking led to ideas of God as an unmoved mover, and thus one who was not a living God capable of acting within creation without being conditioned by creation or limited by it.  Torrance approved of Einstein, Maxwell and Polanyi in their attempts to hold together thought and reality, experience and ideas, instead of tearing them apart and believed that theologians could learn from this.  Such unitary thinking in science, Torrance believed, could help theologians overcome Kantian and Cartesian dualism.  His theology demonstrates exactly how he thought this should be done, especially as this relates to interpreting Scripture.  When form and being are separated, as they are when our ideas are separated from objective reality, then it becomes impossible to know Jesus as he is in himself; we only know Jesus as he appeared to be to his followers and this leaves the door open to the idea that Jesus could be created and re-created according to people's faith.  This was especially problematic with respect to the risen Lord.  When the cord is cut between idea and reality, then it is thought that the resurrection is only a mythological way of reflecting on the death of Jesus instead of as a description of a unique occurrence in his life history that enabled a true understanding of his person and work as recorded in the scriptures.

Implications of thought

Torrance's scientific theology could be especially helpful today in the debate over whether election constitutes God's triunity or whether the triune God eternally elects us without exhausting his being in his actions for us as Creator, Reconciler and Redeemer.  Torrance's thinking, following Barth, clearly comes down against any idea that God's eternal being is constituted by his relations with us in history.  And that is precisely one of the factors that makes his thinking so compelling to so many today.  More than any theologian of the twentieth century, Torrance had a lively sense of Christ's continued high-priestly mediation of humanity to the Father through the Holy Spirit.  It is just this emphasis that enabled Torrance to take seriously the fact that there could be no created substitute for the man Jesus in his continued existence as the risen, ascended and advent Lord who, in his true humanity and true divinity, continues even now and until his second coming, to unite people humanly to himself as his body on earth (the Church) through faith and by grace.  His is a biblically informed and patristically grounded theology that will serve the ecumenical church for many years to come just as the theology of Karl Barth, his mentor, continues to do.

Influence

The fact that there is a scholarly society, formed in 2004, the Thomas F. Torrance Theological Fellowship, with a mission to promote serious reflection on the Christian faith following Torrance's own approach to theology, is certainly testimony to the growing importance of his work and extraordinary contributions to the Christian Church and its theology.
Torrance's thinking has influenced a number of prominent twentieth-century theologians such as Colin E. Gunton (1941-2003), a leading theologian of the Trinity in Great Britain.
Torrance's thinking about the theology of nature has influenced Alister McGrath's approach to the subject of natural theology.
Torrance influenced the thinking of some of today's leading Systematic Theologians in Great Britain and on the Continent such as Ivor Davidson of the University of St. Andrews, David A. S. Fergusson of the University of Edinburgh, Alasdair I. C. Heron of the University of Erlangen, Germany, Alan J. Torrance of the University of St. Andrews, Robert T. Walker of the University of Edinburgh and John B. Webster of the University of Aberdeen.
In the United States, Torrance influenced the theology of Ray S. Anderson (1925-2009), one of his former students, who taught in the area of Theology and Ministry for many years at Fuller Theological Seminary and learned from Torrance to understand theology as a practical science.
Torrance has influenced many other American and Canadian theologians too numerous to mention here.  One indication of this influence is the fact that so many North Americans are engaged in research and doctoral study of Torrance's theology.  Also, Torrance's influence can be seen in the thinking of Matthew Baker of Fordham University; Elmer Colyer of the University of Dubuque Theological Seminary, one of the founding Directors of the T. F. Torrance Theological Fellowship and author of a number of works on Torrance; Gary Deddo, Senior Editor at InterVarsity Press and founding President of the T. F. Torrance Theological Fellowship and author of a number of works on Torrance; George Dion Dragas, Professor of Patrology and Patristics, Holy Cross Greek Orthodox School of Theology, Brookline, Massachusetts; Eric Flett of Eastern University, St. David's, Pennsylvania and author of a book on the Theology of Culture as understood through the thinking of Torrance; Michael Gibson of Vanderbilt University; Myk Habets of Carey Baptist College, Auckland, New Zealand, author of a number of works on Torrance, including a book on Torrance and Theosis; George Hunsinger, Hazel Thompson McCord Professor of Systematic Theology at Princeton Theological Seminary and author of a number of works on Torrance as well as an important book on the Eucharist, influenced by Torrance; Christian Kettler of Friends University, Kansas, the current President of the Thomas F. Torrance Theological Fellowship and author of a number of books that demonstrate Torrance's influence; Paul D. Molnar, professor of Systematic Theology at St. John's University in Queens, New York, past President of the Thomas F. Torrance Theological Fellowship and author of a number of works on Torrance including a book on Torrance's trinitarian theology; Andrew Purves, chair in reformed theology at Pittsburgh Theological Seminary; and Joel Scandrett, director of the Robert E. Webber Center at Trinity School for Ministry in Ambridge, Pennsylvania.

See also

Major works

The Doctrine of Grace in the Apostolic Fathers.  Edinburgh:  Oliver & Boyd, 1948
Calvin’s Doctrine of Man.  London: Lutterworth Press, 1949.
Kingdom and Church:  A Study in the Theology of the Reformation, Edinburgh: Oliver & Boyd, 1956.
Coedited with G.W. Bromiley:  Karl Barth, Church Dogmatics I/2 The Doctrine of the Word of God.  Prolegomena, Part 2, translated by G.T. Thomson and H. Knight.  Edinburgh:  T&T Clark, 1956.
Coedited with G.W. Bromiley:  Karl Barth, Church Dogmatics IV/1 The Doctrine of Reconciliation, Part I, translated by G.W. Bromiley.  Edinburgh:  T&T Clark, 1956.
When Christ Comes and Comes Again.  London:  Hodder & Stoughton, 1957.
Coedited with G.W. Bromiley:  Karl Barth, Church Dogmatics II/1, The Doctrine of God, translated by T.H.L. Parker, W.B. Johnston, H. Knight and J.L.M. Haire.  Edinburgh:  T&T Clark, 1957.
Coedited with G.W. Bromiley:  Karl Barth, Church Dogmatics II/2, The Doctrine of God, translated by G.W. Bromiley, J.C. Campbell, I. Wilson, J. Strathern McNab, H. Knight and R.A. Stewart.  Edinburgh:  T&T Clark, 1957.
Coedited with G.W. Bromiley:  Karl Barth, Church Dogmatics III/1, The Doctrine of Creation, Part 1, translated by J.W. Edwards, O. Bussey and H. Knight.  Edinburgh:  T&T Clark, 1958.
Coedited with G.W. Bromiley:  Karl Barth, Church Dogmatics IV/2, Part 2, The Doctrine of Reconciliation, translated by G.W. Bromiley.  Edinburgh:  T&T Clark, 1958.
Editor, "The Mystery of the Lord's Supper: Sermons by Robert Bruce", Edinburgh: Rutherford House, 1958. 
The Apocalypse Today. Grand Rapids: Eerdmans, 1959.
Conflict and Agreement in the Church, I: Order and Disorder.  London: Lutterworth Press, 1959.
Coedited with G.W. Bromiley:  Karl Barth, Church Dogmatics III/2.  The Doctrine of Creation, Part 2, Translated by H. Knight, J.K.S. Reid, G.W. Bromiley and R.H. Fuller.  Edinburgh, T&T Clark, 1960.
Coedited with G.W. Bromiley:  Karl Barth, Church Dogmatics III/3. The Doctrine of Creation, Part 3, Translated by G.W. Bromiley and R. Ehrlich.  Edinburgh, T&T Clark, 1960.
"Justification: Its Radical Nature and Place in Reformed Doctrine and Life," SJT 13 (1960) 240.
Conflict and Agreement in the Church, II: The Ministry and Sacraments of the Gospel.  London: Lutterworth Press, 1960.
 Karl Barth: an Introduction to his Early Theology, 1910-1931. London:  SCM Press; New York: Harper & Row, 1962.
"Scientific Hermeneutics according to St. Thomas Aquinas." The Journal of Theological Studies XIII.2 (October, 1962): 259–89.
Coedited with D.W. Torrance, Calvin's Commentaries, The Second Epistle of Paul the Apostle to the Corinthians, translated by T.A. Smail.  Edinburgh:  Oliver & Boyd; Grand Rapids, MI:  Eerdmans, 1964.
Theology in Reconstruction.  London: SCM Press Ltd, 1965.
Coedited with D.W. Torrance, Calvin's Commentaries, The Epistles of Paul the Apostle to the Galatians, Ephesians, Philippians and Colossians, translated by T.H.L Parker.  Edinburgh:  Oliver & Boyd; Grand Rapids, MI:  Eerdmans, 1965.
Coedited with D.W. Torrance, Calvin's Commentaries, The Acts of the Apostles 14-26, translated by J.W. Fraser.  Edinburgh:  Oliver & Boyd; Grand Rapids, MI:  Eerdmans, 1966.
Coedited with D.W. Torrance, Calvin's Commentaries, A Harmony of the Gospels:  Matthew, Mark and Luke, 3 vols.  Vols 1 and 3 translated by A.W. Morrison and vol. 2 translated by T.H.L. Parker.  Edinburgh:  Saint Andrew Press, 1972; Grand Rapids, MI:  Eerdmans, 1968.
Space, Time and Incarnation.  London:  Oxford University Press, 1969
Theological Science.  London: Oxford University Press, 1969.
"The Problem of Natural Theology in the Thought of Karl Barth." Religious Studies 6 (1970): 121–35.
God and Rationality.  London: Oxford University Press, 1971.
 "The Relation of the Incarnation to Space in Nicene Theology," The Ecumenical World of Orthodox Civilization: Russia and Orthodoxy. vol. 3. (Essays in Honor of Georges Florovsky) ed. Andrew Blane. Paris: Mouton, 1974.
Theology in Reconciliation: Essays towards Evangelical and Catholic Unity in East and West.  London: Geoffrey Chapman, 1975.
 "Toward Ecumenical Consensus on the Trinity," Theologische Zeitschrift 31 (1975) 337–50.
Space, Time and Resurrection.  Edinburgh: Handsel Press, 1976
The Ground and Grammar of Theology.  Charlottesville: The University Press of Virginia, 1980.
 Christian Theology and Scientific Culture, vol. 1 of series, Theology and Scientific Culture, edited with general foreword by Torrance.  New Edition.  Belfast:  Christian Journals; New York:  Oxford University Press, 1981
Divine and Contingent Order.  Oxford and New York: Oxford University Press, 1981.
The Incarnation: Ecumenical Studies in the Nicene-Constantinopolitan Creed.  Edinburgh: The Handsel Press, 1981.
Reality and Evangelical Theology.  Philadelphia: The Westminster Press, 1982.
A Dynamical Theory of the Electromagnetic Field, James Clerk Maxwell, edited by Torrance, Scottish Academic Press, February 1983, 
"The Deposit of Faith."  The Scottish Journal of Theology 36.1 (1983): 1-28.
Transformation & Convergence in the Frame of Knowledge: Explorations in the Interrelations of Scientific and Theological Enterprise.  Belfast:  Christian Journals; Grand Rapids, MI: William B. Eerdmans, 1984.
The Christian Frame of Mind.  Edinburgh:  Handsel Press, 1985
 Reality and Scientific Theology. The Margaret Harris Lectures, Dundee, 1970 (Theology and Science at the Frontiers of Knowledge, vol 1).  Edinburgh:  Scottish University Press, 1985
"My Interaction with Karl Barth."  In How Karl Barth Changed My Mind, edited by Donald K. McKim, 52–64.  Grand Rapids, Michigan: William B. Eerdmans, 1986.
 "Karl Barth and Patristic Theology," in Theology Beyond Christendom: Essays on the Centenary of the Birth of Karl Barth May 10, 1986. ed. John Thompson. Allison Park, PA: Pickwich, 1986, 215–39.
 "Theological Realism." In The Philosophical Frontiers of Christian Theology: Essays Presented to D. M. MacKinnon. Cambridge: Cambridge University Press, 1982, 169–96.
The Hermeneutics of John Calvin.  Edinburgh: Scottish Academic Press, 1988.
The Trinitarian Faith: The Evangelical Theology of the Ancient Catholic Church.  Edinburgh: T & T Clark, 1988.
Karl Barth, Biblical and Evangelical Theologian.  Edinburgh: T & T Clark, 1990.
The Mediation of Christ.  Colorado Springs: Helmers & Howard, 1992.
Royal Priesthood: A Theology of Ordained Ministry.  Edinburgh: T & T Clark, 1993.
 Ed. Theological Dialogue Between Orthodox and Reformed Churches, 2 Vols. Edinburgh: Scottish Academic Press, 1985–1993.
Trinitarian Perspectives: Toward Doctrinal Agreement.  Edinburgh: T & T Clark, 1994.
Preaching Christ Today:  The Gospel and Scientific Thinking.  Grand Rapids, MI:  Eerdmans, 1994.
Divine Meaning: Studies in Patristic Hermeneutics.  Edinburgh: T & T Clark, 1995.
 "The Uniqueness of Divine Revelation and the Authority of the Scriptures: The Creed Associations's Statement." Scottish Bulletin of Evangelical Theology 13 (Aut. 1995): 97-101.
 The Christian Doctrine of God, One Being Three Persons. Edinburgh: T & T Clark, 1996.
Kingdom and Church: A Study in the Theology of the Reformation.  Eugene, Oregon: Wipf and Stock, 1996.
Scottish Theology: From John Knox to John McLeod Campbell.  Edinburgh: T & T Clark, 1996.
Theological and Natural Science.  Eugene, Oregon: Wipf and Stock, 2002.
The Doctrine of Jesus Christ.  Eugene Oregon: Wipf and Stock Publishers, 2002.
Incarnation: The Person and Life of Christ.  Edited by Robert T. Walker.  Downers Grove, Illinois: InterVarsity Press, 2008.
Atonement: The Person and Work of Christ.  Edited by Robert T. Walker.  Downers Grove, Illinois:  InterVarsity Press, 2009.

References

Citations

Sources 

 Elmer M. Colyer, ed. (2002). The Promise of Trinitarian Theology: Theologians in Dialogue with T. F. Torrance. Lanham, MD:  Rowman & Littlefield Publishers.
 I. John Hesselink (1984). "A Pilgrimage in the School of Christ:  An Interview with T.F. Torrance," Reformed Review 38, No. 1, Autumn 1984.
 Alister E. McGrath (1999). T. F. Torrance: An Intellectual Biography.  Edinburgh:  T&T Clark.
 Donald K. McKim, ed. (1986). How Karl Barth Changed My Mind.  Grand Rapids, MI: Eerdmans.
 Paul D. Molnar (2009). Thomas F. Torrance:  Theologian of the Trinity.  Burlington, VT:  Ashgate Publishing Company.
 
 Thomas F. Torrance (1962).  Theological Science.  New York:  Oxford University Press.
 Thomas F. Torrance, ed. (1985). Theological Dialogue Between Orthodox and Reformed Churches, 2 vols. Edinburgh: Scottish Academic Press.
 Thomas F. Torrance (1990). Karl Barth, Biblical and Evangelical Theologian. Edinburgh: T&T Clark.
 Thomas F. Torrance (1996). Conflict and Agreement in the Church, Vol. I, Order and Disorder, Eugene, OR: Wipf and Stock.
 David. F. Wright and Gary D. Badcock, eds. (1996). Disruption to Diversity: Edinburgh Divinity 1846–1996, Edinburgh: T&T Clark.

Further reading
Daniel J. Cameron. Flesh and Blood: A Dogmatic Sketch Concerning the Fallen Nature View of Christ's Human Nature. Eugene, Oregon: Wipf and Stock, 2016.
Daniel J. Cameron "Thomas Forsyth Torrance: Ecumenical Theologian." http://www.christianitytoday.com/history/2017/december/thomas-forsyth-tf-torrance.html 
Elmer M. Colyer.  How to Read T. F. Torrance: Understanding His Trinitarian & Scientific Theology.  Downers Grove, Illinois: InterVarsity Press, 2001.
Elmer M. Colyer, ed.  The Promise of Trinitarian Theology: Theologians in Dialogue with T. F. Torrance.  Lanham, Maryland: Rowman & Littlefield Publishers, 2002.
David Fergusson. "Torrance, Thomas Forsyth (1913-2007)", Oxford Dictionary of National Biography, Oxford University Press, Jan 2011.
Myk Habets.  Theosis in the Theology of Thomas F. Torrance (Ashgate New Critical Thinking in Religion, Theology, and Biblical Studies).  Farnham, UK: Ashgate, 2009.
Kye Won Lee.  Living in Union With Christ: The Practical Theology of Thomas F. Torrance.  New York: Peter Lang Publishing, 2003.
Tapio Luoma. 'Thomas F. Torrance' in The Blackwell Companion to Science and Christianity J.B. Stump and Alan G. Padgett (eds.). Malden, MA: Wiley-Blackwell, 2012.
Alister E. McGrath.  Thomas F. Torrance: An Intellectual Biography.  Edinburgh: T & T Clark, 1999.
Paul D. Molnar.  Thomas F. Torrance: Theologian of the Trinity.  Farnham, UK: Ashgate, 2009.
Richardson, Kurt. Trinitarian Reality. The Interrelation Between Uncreated and Created Being in the Thought of Thomas Forsyth Torrance. Dissertation, University of Basel, 1993.

External links
The Thomas F. Torrance Manuscript Collection at Princeton Theological Seminary
Obituary in The Times, 11 December 2007
The Boston Collaborative Encyclopedia of Modern Western Theology
TF Torrance Theological Fellowship
T F Torrance Scholarship (University of Edinburgh)
TF Torrance Audio Lectures (mp3)
Eastern Orthodox-Reformed dialogue, Kappel-am-Albis, Switzerland, March 1992 Agreed Statement on the Holy Trinity (pdf)

1913 births
2007 deaths
Scottish Calvinist and Reformed theologians
Academics of the University of Edinburgh
Moderators of the General Assembly of the Church of Scotland
Systematic theologians
Templeton Prize laureates
Alumni of the University of Edinburgh School of Divinity
Alumni of Oriel College, Oxford
University of Basel alumni
Members of the Order of the British Empire
Fellows of the Royal Society of Edinburgh
20th-century Calvinist and Reformed theologians
21st-century Calvinist and Reformed theologians
Writers from Chengdu
Scottish spiritual writers
Fellows of the British Academy
20th-century Ministers of the Church of Scotland
21st-century Ministers of the Church of Scotland